Emily Carter (born December 1960 in New York City) is an American writer.  Her work has appeared in The New Yorker, Story, Gathering of the Tribes, Between C & D, Artforum, Open City, Great River Review, and Poz.

Biography
Carter is the daughter of noted feminist writer Anne (née Roth) Richardson Roiphe and writer Jack Richardson. Her half-sister is writer Katie Roiphe. Carter attended high school at the Robert Louis Stevenson School "for Gifted Underachievers" in New York City, and college at New York University. She has been married to punk rock guitarist Johnnie Sage Ammentorp, RN (of such bands as Christian Death, The Joneses, and The Mau-Mau's) since 1999. Together they divide their time between Albuquerque & New York City. Emily can also be found for many months each year in Anhedonia, PA.

Awards
 1996 McKnight Foundation Artist Fellowship for Writers Grant
 1998 The Loft Literary Center Grant
 2001 Whiting Award for Fiction

Works

Books
 
"Parachute Silk", Originally published in The New Yorker, July 27, 1992
"Bad Boy Walking", Originally published in The New Yorker, February 14, 1994
"WLUV", Reprinted in The Barcelona Review, July–August 2003

Anthologies

References

External links
"A word with the writer: Emily Carter", Collected Stories, 2000
"Tales of the City": Emily Carter interviewed by Claude Peck. "POZ Magazine," August 1998
"An Encyclopedia of Little Abominations":  Emily Carter interview featured on cover of City Pages, Minneapolis, August 30, 2000
Profile at The Whiting Foundation

American women writers
1960 births
Writers from New York City
Living people
New York University alumni
American people of Jewish descent
21st-century American women